Murder: Ultimate Grounds for Divorce is a British thriller film released in 1984, starring Roger Daltrey of The Who in the main role of Roger Cunningham.

Plot synopsis
The story is about Roger Cunningham (Roger Daltrey) and his unpleasant British wife Valerie Cunningham (Toyah Willcox). They have been married for ten years, and their friends Edwin and Philipa for seven. During that time they spent every social hour together, But each is living a double life.

When camping one weekend, the four get stranded. Arguments arise, and secrets begin coming out: accusations of affairs, marriages of convenience, and homosexuality (all are shown in flashbacks).

Cast
 Roger Daltrey as Roger Cunningham
 Toyah Willcox as Valerie Cunningham
 Leslie Ash as Philippa
 Terry Raven as Edwin

Filming location
The film was filmed in Hastings, East Sussex, England, UK.

References

1980 films
British thriller drama films
1980s thriller drama films
1980 drama films
1980s English-language films
1980s British films